Shattered God: A Diary of a Demobilized Soldier (砕かれた神: ある復員兵の手記) Kudakareta kami: aru fukuinhei no shuki. By Watanabe Kiyoshi. Published by Iwanami Shoten Publishing.

This diary (written between September 2, 1945 to April 20, 1946) is by a WWII demobilized soldier (Watanabe Kiyoshi). Watanabe writes his daily events beginning with the surrender of Japan and through some of the Allied Occupation of Japan. Although there are no English translations, John W. Dower and Kenneth J. Ruoff mention him in Dower's Pulitzer Prize–winning book, Embracing Defeat, and Ruoff's The People's Emperor respectively.
On April 20, Watanabe left his village to take a job in Tokyo. He had heard that anyone could write a letter to the emperor now, and he did so before leaving. He used the familiar "you" (anata), unthinkable before the surrender, in addressing him. He had fought hard for the emperor in accordance with his orders, Watanabe wrote, but since the defeat he had lost all trust and hope in him. As a result, he wished to sever their relationship. He then offered an accounting of all the salary that he had been paid by the imperial navy and every article he could remember having received in his years of service--a long list indeed, itemizing food as well as clothing and other goods. The total, as he calculated it, came to 4,281 yen and 5 sen. With his letter, he enclosed a check for 4,282 yen. "Thus," the letter concluded, "I owe you nothing."
Watanabe begins his journal with: 「天皇陛下が処刑されるかもしれない」という噂が村うちに流れている。

"'Perhaps His Majesty the Emperor will be executed' is the rumor that is flowing throughout the village."  This beginning line shows the day to day confusions that he was facing during the Japanese surrender and the beginning stages of the U.S. Occupation.

About the Author (Watanabe Kiyoshi) 

Watanabe Kiyoshi was born to a farm owner in Shizuoka Prefecture in the 14th year of the Taisho Period (1925). He died in the summer of 1981 at the age of 56.

Military career 

 Watanabe is one of 1,376 survivors of the 2,399 soldiers aboard the sunken Japanese battleship Musashi. Watanabe wrote about his experiences on the Musashi in Senkan Musashi no saigo, or "The End of the Battleship Musashi."

References 

Diaries